Kemi Adeosun (born 9 March 1967) is the former Finance Minister of Nigeria and former chairman of the Board of African Export–Import Bank (AfreximBank).

Early life and education
Adeosun Kemi was born on 9 March 1967 in London, England to Nigerian parents, both who hails from Ogun State.Her Father was government civil Engineer and she was the third child of her father out of four children. Adeosun Kemi earned a Bachelor of Science degree in Economics from a public university locate in Borough, Newham, London called the University of East London and a Postgraduate Diploma in Public Financial Management from the University of London and also attended various Executive Management programmes for her professional career courses such as Leadership training at the prestigious Whartin Business school and she also attended Institute of Chartered Accountant of England and Whare in 1994, which make her qualified as a Chartered Accountant.

Career
Kemi Adeosun began her career as an accounting assistant at British Telecom, London, from 1989 till 1990, after which she moved to Goodman Jones, London, working as a senior audit officer from 1990 till 1993. Kemi then became the manager of Internal Audit at London Underground, London and Prism Consulting from 1994 till 2000 before joining PricewaterhouseCoopers, London as Senior Manager from 2000 till 2002. In 2002, She became financial controller at Chapel Hill Denham Management and subsequently, Managing Director in 2010. After working with Quo Vadis Partnership as Managing Director from 2010 to 2011, she was then appointed Ogun State's Commissioner of Finance 2011. Kemi maintained this role from 2011 to 2015. She was a key part of Governor Ibikunle Amosun's Mission to Build, which turned around economic fortunes of the state.

In November 2015, Adeosun Kemi was appointed Nigeria's Minister of Finance by President Muhammadu Buhari. During the annual general meeting of Afreximbank in Abuja to commemorate its 25th anniversary, Adeosun was elected chairman of the board of the bank. Kemi Adeosun succeeded the outgoing chairman Ndagijimana Uzziel, Minister of Finance of the Republic of Rwanda.

NYSC certificate scandal
On 7 July 2018, Nigerian online newspaper Premium Times alleged that Kemi Adeosun had illegally obtained her NYSC exemption certificate to get into public office. On 9 July, NYSC Director of Press and Public relations Adeyemi Adenike released a statement that confirmed that Adeosun legitimately submitted a request for an exemption certificate, but also stated that investigations were still ongoing to verify the approval of the exemption certificate. On 14 September 2018, Adeosun resigned as Minister of Finance in a written letter to the President due to the alleged NYSC Certificate forgery scandal.
 

On 7 July 2021, the Abuja Division of the Federal High Court cleared Adeosun, holding that, as a British citizen, she had not been qualified to take part in the NYSC as at the time she graduated at the age of 22 and that when she returned to the country and became a Nigerian citizen aged over 30 she was not eligible for youth service.

Political association 
After officially being non-partisan throughout her career, Kemi Adeosun joined Nigeria's ruling party, the All Progressives Congress (APC), on 5 May 2018.

Other activities
 African Development Bank (AfDB), Ex-Officio Member of the Board of Governors (2015-2018)
 United Nations Joint Staff Pension Fund, Member of the Investment Committee (2018)
 World Bank, Ex-Officio Alternate Member of the Board of Governors (2015-2018)

Professional memberships
 Institute of Chartered Accountants in England and Wales
 Institute of Chartered Accountants of Nigeria.

See also
Finance Minister of Nigeria

References

External links

 
 
 

Living people
1967 births
Buhari administration personnel
Politicians from London
English people of Nigerian descent
English people of Yoruba descent
Finance ministers of Nigeria
Nigerian bankers
Nigerian accountants
Alumni of the University of East London
British Telecom people
PricewaterhouseCoopers people
Yoruba women in politics
Yoruba bankers
Alumni of the University of London
Black British people
British financial analysts
Nigerian financial analysts
Female finance ministers
21st-century Nigerian politicians
21st-century British women politicians
Women government ministers of Nigeria
British emigrants to Nigeria
Nigerian chairpersons of corporations
Women corporate directors